Georgieva may refer to:

Irina Georgieva Bokova (born 1952), Bulgarian politician and the former Director-General of UNESCO (2009–2017)
Maria Luisa Doseva-Georgieva (1894–1975), one of the first two women licensed as an architect in Bulgaria
Anka Georgieva (born 1959), Bulgarian rowing coxswain who competed in the 1980 Summer Olympics
Antonina Georgieva (born 1948), Bulgarian and Serbian chess player and Woman International Master (WIM, 1972)
Daniela Georgieva (born 1969), retired Bulgarian sprinter
Diliana Georgieva (born 1965), Bulgarian individual rhythmic gymnast
Elena Georgieva (1930–2007), Bulgarian linguist who revolutionized the way that the Bulgarian language is studied
Gabriela Georgieva (born 1997), Bulgarian swimmer
Greta Georgieva (born 1965), Bulgarian rowing coxswain
Hristina Georgieva (born 1972), female javelin thrower from Bulgaria
Ivana Georgieva (born 1971), Bulgarian fencer
Kapka Georgieva (born 1951), Bulgarian rower who competed in the 1976 Summer Olympics
Kristalina Georgieva (born 1953), Bulgarian politician and the current chief executive officer of the International Monetary Fund
Kristina Georgieva (born 1992), Bulgarian beauty pageant titleholder who was crowned Miss Universe Bulgaria 2014
Magdalena Georgieva (born 1962), rower from Bulgaria
Marina Georgieva (born 1997), Austrian footballer
Maya Georgieva (born 1955), Bulgarian former volleyball player who competed in the 1980 Summer Olympics
Nadezhda Georgieva (born 1961), Bulgarian former sprinter
Nelina Georgieva (born 1997), Bulgarian pop singer from the Bulgarian city of Kazanlak
Rosa Georgieva (born 1956), Bulgarian sprint canoeist who competed in the late 1970s
Stanka Georgieva (born 1950), Bulgarian rowing coxswain
Tanya Georgieva (born 1970), Bulgarian sprint canoeist who competed in the early 1990s
Victoria Georgieva (born 1997), Bulgarian singer and songwriter who took part in the Eurovision Song Contest 2021
Viliana Georgieva (born 1982), Bulgarian TV show host and model for designers
Zlatka Georgieva (born 1969), retired Bulgarian sprinter who specialized in the women's 200 metres
Marina Georgieva-Nikolova (born 1980), Bulgarian short-track speed-skater
Tsvetana Georgieva Maneva (born 1944), Bulgarian actress

See also
George (disambiguation)
Georgia (disambiguation)
Georgie (disambiguation)
Georgiev
Georgiyevka